"Southern Gul" is a song recorded by American singer Erykah Badu. It features beatboxer and rapper Rahzel, a former member of The Roots, who also co-wrote and produced the song. The song was released as the lead single from Rahzel's debut studio album Make the Music 2000 (1999) on July 26, 1999, by Motown Records.

A moderate commercial success, "Southern Gul" peaked at number 76 on the US Billboard Hot 100 and number 24 on the US Hot R&B/Hip-Hop Songs.

Track listing

Charts

Release history

References

1999 singles
Erykah Badu songs
Songs written by Erykah Badu
1998 songs
Motown singles